Awam Express is a suspended passenger train operated daily by Pakistan Railways between Karachi and Peshawar. It is one of the longest continuous running passenger trains in Pakistan. Pakistan Railways didn't resume its operation after suspending during the 2022 flood.

Route 
 Karachi Cantonment–Peshawar Cantonment via Karachi–Peshawar Railway Line

Station stops

Equipment 
Awam Express offers seating in AC Standard and Economy classes.

Incidents 
15 September 2016: Awam Express collided with a freight train near Multan, killing at least six people and injuring more than 150.

Cease of operation 
Pakistan Railways suspended the operation of five trains during the 2022 flood. PR couldn't resume its operation after suspending during the 2022 flood.

References 

Named passenger trains of Pakistan
Passenger trains in Pakistan